Anglerne "Angie" Annelus (born January 10, 1997) is an American sprinter. She was the 2018 champion in the women's 200-meter dash at the NCAA Division I Championships despite several months of injury, and successfully defended her title in 2019, out-leaning world under-20 record holder Sha'Carri Richardson by less than a hundredth of a second.

She placed third in the 200 m at the 2019 U.S. Championships, qualifying to represent the United States at the 2019 World Athletics Championships in Doha. In Doha she progressed to the final and placed fourth.

Annelus' father Annessoir was born in Artibonite, Haiti, where he was a captured prisoner as a result of coup d'état. He managed to escape and emigrated to Kansas City shortly after and was a pardoned refugee.

References

External links

 
 
 
  (USC Trojans)
  (UCLA Bruins)

1997 births
Living people
American sportspeople of Haitian descent
American female sprinters
African-American female track and field athletes
Track and field athletes from Kansas City, Missouri
University of Southern California alumni
USC Trojans women's track and field athletes
World Athletics Championships athletes for the United States
21st-century African-American sportspeople
21st-century African-American women